Xerez DFC Fútbol Sala, also called Xerez Toyota Nimauto for sponsorship reasons, is a spanish futsal team from Jerez de la Frontera, in Andalusia (Spain). The team plays in 2ª División B, holding home matches at Polideportivo Ruiz Mateos, in Jerez, with an overall 1,220-seat capacity. The team colours are usually blue shirts and socks, with white shorts.

History

It was created on 31 July 2014 by the Assembly of Xerecistas. It started to play in Tercera División Andaluza, in province of Seville, due to there were not enough futsal teams in province of Cádiz to form a league. Xerez Toyota Nimauto promoted to Tercera División in March 2015 after winning the league. On 28 May 2015, Xerez Toyota Nimauto got the second place and promoted to 2º División B.

Seasons

Current squad

Coach:  Juan Carlos Gálvez

Presidents

Coaches

See also
Xerez Deportivo FC
Club de Rugby Xerez Deportivo FC
Atletismo Chapín Xerez Deportivo FC

References

External links 

Futsal clubs in Spain
Sport in Jerez de la Frontera
Sports teams in Andalusia